

The Blériot Bl-115 was a French biplane airliner of the 1920s, best remembered for the part it played in the French exploration of Africa.  For its day, it was a large aircraft, mounting one pair of engines on the upper wing and one pair on the lower.  First flying on 9 May 1923, the prototype crashed on 23 June, killing its pilot, Jean Casale.

A refined version of the aircraft, the 115-bis was flown in June 1924.

Operational; history
The third and fourth machines built (christened Roland Garros and Jean Casale) were used in Colonel de Goÿs' attempts to create air routes to Africa.  Commanded by Jean Dagnaux, they departed France on 18 January 1925, they arrived in Colomb-Béchar, Algeria, on 28 January.  The expedition ended in disaster on 7 February in Niamey, Niger when the Jean Casale crashed on take-off, killing its radio operator and seriously injuring its two pilots, including Dagnaux. They had covered .

Variants
Blériot Bl-115
Four-engined airliner, powered by 4x  Hispano-Suiza 8Ac engines.
Blériot Bl-115bis
Improved version of the Blériot Bl-115, powered by 4x  Hispano-Suiza 8Ab engines.
Bleriot Bl-103
Projected bomber version. Not built.

Specifications (Bl-115)

References

Further reading
 
 

Aviation in Niger
115
1920s French airliners
Four-engined tractor aircraft
Four-engined piston aircraft
Aircraft first flown in 1923